Kecoughtan High School (pronounced "KICK-a-tan") is a public high school located in Hampton, Virginia. The current grades offered are 9–12. Kecoughtan High School is one of four high schools located in the Hampton City Public School District. The other three are Phoebus, Bethel, and Hampton high schools.

Feeder pattern
Asbury Elementary School
Barron Elementary School
Booker Elementary School
Langley Elementary School
Phillips Elementary School
Capt John Smith Elementary School
Jones Magnet Middle School
Syms Middle School
Eaton Middle School
Ann H. Kilgore Gifted Center

History
Kecoughtan High School was originally built in 1961–1962 to handle the overflow of Hampton High School, the oldest high school in the city. Since then Kecoughtan has been used as an educational facility for high school students in the Fox Hill area, a major neighborhood in the Hampton Roads region. Kecoughtan is the only high school near the neighborhood.

The word Kecoughtan comes from the name of the Virginia Algonquian Native Americans living there when the English colonists arrived in the Hampton Roads area in 1607. The Native Americans were originally named Kikotan (also spelled Kiccowtan, Kikowtan etc.)

The first academic school year was 1963–64. Since the school was built to handle the overflow of Hampton High School students who were previously enrolled as sophomores at Hampton High School were enrolled as juniors at Kecoughtan High School. This makes the first graduating class 1965 and the 50th Graduating class from KHS was the class of 2014.

Sports
Kecoughtan High School offers Baseball, Basketball, Cheerleading, Cross country, Field Hockey, Football, Golf, Soccer, Softball, Swimming, Tennis, Track, Boys and girls volleyball and Wrestling.

In 2016, the school's wrestling team completed its first undefeated regular season, for the first time in the program's history.

In 2016, some players were announced as a part 2015 Group 5A All-State Football team.

Notable alumni

 Lisa Aukland - bodybuilder
 Macey Brooks - National Football League player (1997 - 2000)
 Trenton Cannon - National Football League player (2018–Present)
 Jake Cave - baseball player
 Jo Ann Davis – Republican former congresswoman of Virginia
 Tom Gear - politician
 James Genus - jazz bassist
 Dwight Hollier - National Football League player (1992 - 2000)
 Jerod Mayo - National Football League player (2008 – 2015)
 Randall Reed - Lieutenant General in the United States Air Force
 Bert Mizusawa – Major General in the United States Army Reserve
 Sam Newsome - jazz player

Marching and Symphonic Band
The Kecoughtan Marching "Warriors" are a Class AAA band that has been a Virginia Honor Band three times.
The band was part of the 2011 National Memorial Day Parade Lineup in Washington, D.C., on May 30, 2011.

The Kecoughtan band has hosted their annual "Warrior Classic" marching band competition at Darling Stadium since 1990.

External links
Kecoughtan High School
Kecoughtan High School Band

References

Schools in Hampton, Virginia
Public high schools in Virginia
Educational institutions established in 1962
1962 establishments in Virginia